The Village Blacksmith is a 1917 British silent drama film directed by Arthur Rooke and A.E. Coleby and starring Rooke, Coleby and Janet Alexander. It is based on the poem The Village Blacksmith by Henry Wadsworth Longfellow.

Cast
 Janet Alexander as Mary Rivers 
 A.E. Coleby as Dan Thorne 
 Arthur Rooke as Arthur Thorne 
 C. Arundale as Davis Thorne 
 Joyce Templeton as Small child 
 N. Watt-Phillips

References

External links

1917 films
1917 drama films
British silent feature films
British drama films
Films directed by Arthur Rooke
Films based on works by Henry Wadsworth Longfellow
British black-and-white films
1910s English-language films
1910s British films
Silent drama films